Adopaeoides prittwitzi, the sunrise skipper, is a species of grass skipper in the butterfly family Hesperiidae. It is found in Central America and North America.

References

Further reading

 

Hesperiinae
Articles created by Qbugbot
Butterflies described in 1884